The 1920 North Coast Rugby League season was the first season of rugby league football in the area that is now the Sunshine Coast, Queensland, all of the clubs having changed over from rugby union in March 1920.

Fixtures 
At a meeting of held at the Royal Hotel, Nambour, on Monday, April 19th. fixtures were presented by the committee appointed to do so, and were adopted.

April 24th.
Woombye-Buderim, at Woombye.
Nambour-Cooran, at Nambour.
Eumundi-Palmwoods, at Eumundi.
Yandina-Cooroy, at Yandina.
Pomona-Mooloolah at Pomona.

May 1st.
Buderim-Eumundi. at Nambour.
Cooran-Yandina, at Cooran.
Nambour-Pomona at Nambour.
Palmwoods-Woombye. at Palmwoods
Cooroy-Mooloolah, at Cooroy.

May 8th.
Buderim-Pomona, at Nambour.
Eumundi-Cooran, at Eumundi
Yandina-Woombye, at Yandina
Cooroy-Nambour, at Nambour.
Mooloolah-Palmwoods, at Mooloolah

May 15th.
Mooloolah-Buderim,
Woombye-Pomona, at Woombye.
Nambour-Eumundi, at Nambour.
Cooran-Cooroy, at Cooran.
Palmwoods-Yandina. at Palmwoods

May 22nd.
Buderim-Cooran, at Nambour.
Yandina-Eumundi, at Yandina.
Pomona-Palmwoods, at Pomona.
Mooloolah-Nambour, at Mooloolah.
Woombye-Cooroy at Woombye.

May 29th.
Nambour-Buderim at Nambour.
Cooran-Woomhye, at Cooran.
Cooroy-Palmwoods at Cooroy.
Eumundi-Mooloolah. at Eumundi.
Yandina-Pomona. at Yandina.

June 5th.
Buderim-Cooroy, at Nambour.
Woombye-Nambour, at Woombye.
Palmwoods-Cooran, at Palmwoods .
Pomona-Eumundi, at Pomona.
Mooloolah-Yandina, at Mooloolah

June 12th.
Buderim-Palmwoods. at Buderim.
Eumundi- Woombye, al Eumundi.
Nambour- Yandina, at Nambour.
Cooran-Mooloolah, at Cooran.
Pomona-Cooroy at Pomona.

June 19th.
Yandina-Buderim at Yandina.
Cooran-Pomona, at Coonin.
Cooroy-Eumundi, at Cooroy.
Woombyc-Mooloolah, at Woombye.
Palmwoods-ambour, at Palmwoods

July 3rd.
Hospital Cup: Woombye-Cooroy, at Cooroy.
Protest match: Eumundi-Nambour, at Cooroy as a curtain raiser.

References 

1920 in Australian rugby league